Agonac is a commune in the Dordogne department in Nouvelle-Aquitaine in southwestern France. Agonac station has rail connections to Bordeaux, Périgueux and Limoges.

Population

History
The settlements "Borie-Vieille" and "Les Cadagnes" have yielded prehistoric remains.

In the 11th century, the village was built on a hill controlling valleys with difficult access. Agonac was one of four fourtresses and protected the area from the Norman invasions.

See also
Communes of the Dordogne department

References

Communes of Dordogne